Zhang Ye (born May 28, 1968) is a Chinese singer.

Biography
Zhang was born in Changsha, Hunan province in 1968. Zhang entered  to learn the art of Chinese opera when she was 14. Zhang was graduated from China Conservatory of Music in 1991, her teacher was Jin Tielin.

Works
 Enter the New Age
 Hello, Motherland
 Everything Goes Well
 Enjoy a Happy Get-together
 Extend Auspicious Wishes

References

1968 births
Living people
Musicians from Fujian
Chinese women singers
China Conservatory of Music alumni